Malinchism or malinchist (sometimes simply Malinche) is a form of attraction that a person from one culture develops for another culture, a particular case of cultural cringe. It has been referred to as ethnic or national self-hatred. The term is used in Latin America, and especially in Mexico, to refer to the development of an admiration for the culture, ideas, behaviors, and lifestyle of the United States over those that are homegrown.

Origin 
La Malinche is used as a symbol for those who assisted Spaniards in destroying indigenous Americans' way of life and culture. "Malinchism" may be taken as a pejorative, as an expression of disdain for those who are attracted by foreign values, thinking them superior, of better quality and worthy of imitation. It is derived from the name of Hernán Cortés's Nahua advisor La Malinche, referring to a deep-rooted Mexican inferiority complex.

Uses 
In Mexico and in other countries the term "malinchism" or "malinchist" applies to all those who feel an attraction to foreign cultures and disregard for their own culture. It also applies to politics, as in El Salvador, where leftist political parties call their opponents "malinchist right-wing". The myth of Malinche came to be applied as a technical term for giving preference to Western cultures. The concept has a potential broader application to refer to a colonized country developing an admiration or affection for a colonizing country.

Malinchism is also associated with the depiction of women as a source of betrayal and nefarious behavior. In Mexican popular culture, this theme plays out with Malinche often portrayed as both the deceiver and the deceived. In theatrical productions, she is sometimes portrayed as a victim of conquest, and sometimes the manufacturer of her own destiny. She is represented in art as a figure showing women's inborn deception and guilt — one who used her sexuality and betrayed her children. Even in dance, the dichotomy persists. In La Malinche, a ballet composed in 1949, by José Limón, Malinche is at first an unwilling victim, then assumes the proud deportment of an aristocrat, and in the end, weighted down by the finery she wears, she gives birth to a mixed-race child who rejects her. In literature, Malinche has been compared to Eve, the temptress who through deception, leads men astray.

Studies 
Ueltschy and Ryans argued that upper-class consumers in Mexico display malinchism in their preference for American imports, rather than local Mexican brands. As result, American products are popular in middle class markets and their advertisers generally concentrate their efforts on urban Mexico City and avoid working class and rural areas. Monterrey and Guadalajara, for example, purchase 70 percent of American imports. Jiménez et al. developed a scale for measuring malinchismo that accounted for the favoring of foreign entertainment, foreign people, foreign food, and foreign products among adolescents.

See also
 Mongrel complex
 Yanacona, a Mapuche term for disloyal people of their kind
 Uncle Tom
 Useful Jew
 West Brit

Notes

References

 
Political culture
Cultural studies
Political metaphors
Pejorative terms for people
Mexican culture
Feminism in Mexico
Treason
Eponyms